{{Infobox rail
|railroad_name=Stewartstown Railroad
|image=
|image_caption=
|start_year=1885
|end_year=present
|gauge=4' 8 1/2|length=7.4 miles
|hq_city=Stewartstown
|locale=Stewartstown, Pennsylvania, US
|website=
|routemap=
}}
The Stewartstown Railroad is a heritage railroad in Stewartstown, Pennsylvania.  Chartered in 1884 by local interests in the Stewartstown area and opened in 1885, the Stewartstown Railroad survives today in very much original condition and retains its original corporate charter.

The railroad was organized by a group of local citizens in 1884 to connect Stewartstown and its agricultural base with the Northern Central Railway's Harrisburg–Baltimore route at nearby New Freedom. The  route posed many obstacles, including steep grades and sharp curves, and took nearly a year to complete, opening in 1885. In the early years, there were six trains each day, carrying passengers and agricultural products.

Efforts in 1906, 1909, and 1924 to extend the New Park & Fawn Grove from Fawn Grove to slate and marble quarries in Delta were never realized. The Stewartstown Railroad took over the New Park & Fawn Grove in 1923 and operated it until 1935.

The years of the Great Depression took their toll on the Stewartstown Railroad Company and revenues dropped sharply. The end of the steam locomotive era marked the introduction of a gasoline powered combination car that provided both passenger and express service. Passenger ridership plummeted from the mid-1920s onward and officially ceased in 1952.

The railroad closed in 1972 after Hurricane Agnes destroyed parts of the former Northern Central line between Harrisburg and Baltimore, severing the Stewartstown's link with the national rail network. The Stewartstown remained closed until 1985, when the former Northern Central line reopened between New Freedom and York. (Track from New Freedom south to Baltimore was never repaired and was eventually removed.) During this time, the Stewartstown ran excursion trips and occasional freight service, connecting at York with what was then Conrail and the Maryland & Pennsylvania Railroad. 

The Stewartstown later ran as a heritage railroad but ceased operating again in 2004. Up to that point, former president and shareholder George M. Hart had advanced the railroad his personal funds to keep it afloat. After Hart died in 2008, his will stipulated that his executors should collect the debt, over $350,000, owed to his estate. While the railroad agreed that his contributions were loans, they also believed that the debt would be forgiven after his death. The Bucks County Historical Society, a beneficiary of Hart's estate, demanded immediate payment while the railroad proposed a five-year repayment plan. In July 2011, the estate filed an Adverse Abandonment application with the Surface Transportation Board, which was granted in November 2012. This allowed the estate to start foreclosue proceedings on the railroad and sell its assets. Eventually donors came forward to pay off the debt in 2013.

In 2006, when the railroad had been dormant for two years, a Friends'' group organized to help restore service.  By 2008, the Stewartstown station was reopened for visitors and limited excursion service was restored later that year. The rail line's reactivation was not without some opposition: the local newspaper applauded preservation of the historic buildings but argued that conversion to a rail trail would be more cost-effective and draw more users. By 2015, the railroad had a crew of volunteers working on operations.

Currently, passenger and tourist trains operate out of the 1914 Stewartstown Railroad Station, for either Coach rides or Caboose rides, approximately a mile and a half down the line and back. Former Reading Railroad coach 1341 was returned to service in December 2016 and in June 2018 a new open air car owned and built by the Friends of the Stewartstown Railroad, Inc. was available.  In January 2021, it acquired a former Missouri-Kansas-Texas Railroad maintenance car that it was adapting for handicap access.

Motorcar rides operate out of the Stewartstown Railroad Station and run the entire length of the 7.4-mile line. Approximately one weekend a month motorcar trains run from Stewartstown to New Freedom, and return.

The Railroad offers holiday specific trains, such as Easter Bunny Trains, Fall Foliage Runs, Halloween Trains, and Santa Trains.

The Shrewsbury Railroad Station, Stewartstown Railroad Station, and Stewartstown Engine House at Stewartstown are listed on the National Register of Historic Places in York County, Pennsylvania. Also listed are the Deer Creek Bridge, Ridge Road Bridge, Stone Arch Road Bridge, and Valley Road Bridge.

Locomotive roster

References

External links
 Stewartstown Railroad website
 Stewartstown Railroad, National Railway Historical Society
 Friends of the Stewartstown Railroad, Inc. website

Heritage railroads in Pennsylvania
Tourist attractions in York County, Pennsylvania